Lepidosphaeria is a genus of fungi in the family Testudinaceae. This is a monotypic genus, containing the single species Lepidosphaeria nicotiae.

References

Pleosporales
Monotypic Dothideomycetes genera